Caicara del Orinoco is a town in, and the administrative seat of, Cedeño Municipality, Bolívar State, Venezuela.

Currently the Venezuelan government is building a bridge across the Orinoco at Caicara.  When completed the bridge will be 2.4 km long.

Prehistory
Alexander von Humboldt discovered petroglyphs carved in the granite and gneiss near the river at Caicara.  Further investigation revealed a large number of prehistoric petroglyphs in the area.

History
It was founded in the middle of the Eighteenth Century.

Politics 
The Mayor of Caicara del Orinoco is Rafael Gutiérrez, a member of the United Socialist Party of Venezuela

Notes

Populated places in Bolívar (state)
Petroglyphs
Rock art in South America
Archaeological sites in Venezuela
Pre-Columbian archaeological sites